Jail Birds of Paradise is a 1934 Metro-Goldwyn-Mayer short starring Dorothy Appleby plus brothers Moe and Curly Howard (of Three Stooges fame).

The film was written and directed by Al Boasberg, and filmed in Technicolor. The film was released on March 10, 1934.

Synopsis
When the Warden of Paradise Prison is absent for three months, his daughter Miss Deering (Dorothy Appleby) decides to turn the prison into the 'Paradise', a luxurious hotel complete with all the amenities, and she sets the prison guards to run the 'hotel' for her. As Miss Deering and her secretary tour the prison there are a series of sight gags that involve various prisoners; among them, registering at Paradise's front desk, are Joe Pantz (Moe Howard), an axe murderer who has transferred from Leavenworth.

During a show held in the Prison Auditorium that evening with dinner and music, Moe enters with Curly Howard, who is wearing a toupée, and the two work a hair tonic scheme among the other prisoners; this scene was later reworked for Moe Howard, Larry Fine and Joe DeRita in their 1961 feature, Snow White and the Three Stooges. The evening ends with gunshots and a vase-throwing melee among the prisoners.

The Dodge Twins appear in a number called "The Lock Step", which had been shot in color early in 1930 at the then brand new MGM extra high sound Stage Six for The March of Time, an MGM musical which was never finished or released. This sequence was recycled in Jail Birds of Paradise.

Cast
Dorothy Appleby as Miss Deering, Prison Warder 
Heinie Conklin as Prisoner 
Beth Dodge as Bell Hop (as Dodge Twins) 
Betty Dodge as Bell Hop (as Dodge Twins) 
Harrison Greene as Prisoner 
Curly Howard as Prisoner (as Jerry Howard) 
Moe Howard as Joe Pantz 
M-G-M Dancing Girls as Themselves 
Frank Moran as Convict 
Jack Pennick as Redface (convict) 
Shirley Ross as herself 
Leo White as Tailor 
Austin J. Young as Dancer

Preservation status
This film is now considered a lost film, with no studio, collector prints or negatives known to exist. According to some sources the only known copy was destroyed in the 1965 MGM vault fire.

See also
The Three Stooges filmography
Hello Pop! (1933)
List of lost films

References

External links

Jailbirds of Paradise on 'The Three Stooges Online Filmography'

1934 films
Metro-Goldwyn-Mayer short films
The Three Stooges films
1934 musical comedy films
Lost American films
American musical comedy films
American prison comedy films
1934 lost films
Lost comedy films
1930s English-language films
1930s American films